Type 3 (三式, San-Shiki) was a Japanese Navy aircraft machine gun used during World War II. It was based on the American M2 Browning machine gun but used the 13.2x99mm Hotchkiss cartridge.

History 
The Type 3 was a copy of the  M2 Browning and had very similar ammunition to that of the 13.2 mm Hotchkiss M1929 machine gun. Despite the small difference in calibers, it was possible to use M2 Browning tapes in the Japanese machine gun, which apparently took place during World War II. The machine gun was produced from 1943 to 1945. It came in flexible and fixed versions which differed slightly in construction details. The flexible version featured a longer barrel.

The fixed version was used on later models of the Mitsubishi A6M Zero fighter and prototypes of the Kawanishi N1K Shiden Kai. In the mobile version, Type 3 was partially replaced by the end of World War II by the Type 2 machine gun.

See also 
 List of machine guns

Notes

Literature 
 René J. Francillon: Japanese Aircraft of the Pacific War. Londyn: Putnam, 1979. .
 Robert C. Mikesh: Japanese Aircraft Equipment 1940-1945. Atglen, PA: Schiffer Publishing, 2004. .
 Anthony G. Williams: Rapid Fire: The Development of Automatic Cannon and Heavy Machine Guns for Armies, Navies, and Air Forces. Airlife Publishing, Ltd, 2000. .

References

Aircraft guns
Heavy machine guns
Machine guns of Japan